The Development Bank of the Central African States, usually known for its French initials, BDEAC, is a multilateral development bank that is  charged with financing the development of the member states of Economic and Monetary Community of Central Africa (CEMAC). The BDEAC is different from the Bank of the Central African States (BEAC), which is a central bank.

History 
BDEAC was created through an agreement signed December 3, 1975, in Bangui by the heads of state of Cameroon, Central African Republic, Republic of the Congo and Gabon. It started its operations on January 3, 1977.

Governance 

The General Assembly is BDEAC's supreme organ.  The Bank is led by a president elected by the General Assembly for a single five year term. This president is assisted by a vice president elected under the same conditions. Since 2022 the president is Dieudonné EVOU MEKOU.

See also 

 Bank of the Central African States (BEAC)
 Economic and Monetary Community of Central Africa (CEMAC)
 West African Development Bank

References

External links  

 Official site of the Development Bank of the Central African States

Multilateral development banks
Economic Community of Central African States
Banks of Africa
Banks established in 1975
Organisations based in Brazzaville